
Bochnia County is a unit of territorial administration and local government (powiat) in Lesser Poland Voivodeship, southern Poland. It came into being on January 1, 1999, as a result of the Polish local government reforms passed in 1998.

As of 2019 its total population is 106,626, out of which the population of Bochnia is 29,814, that of Nowy Wiśnicz is 2,757, and the rural population is 74,055.

Neighbouring counties
Bochnia County is bordered by Proszowice County to the north, Brzesko County to the east, Limanowa County to the south, and Myślenice County, Wieliczka County and Kraków County to the west.

Administrative division
The county is subdivided into nine gminas (one urban, one urban-rural and seven rural). These are listed in the following table, in descending order of population.

References

 
Bochnia